The Libertarian Party of Canada fielded 26 candidates in the 2008 federal election, none of whom were elected. A list of these candidates may be found here.

Alberta

Calgary Centre–North
 Jason McNeil

Calgary Southwest
 Dennis Young, Party leader

Peace River
 Melanie Simard

Wild Rose
 Krista Zoobkoff

British Columbia

BurnabyNew Westminster
 Ismet Yetisen

New WestminsterCoquitlam
 Lewis Dahlby

North Vancouver
 Tunya Audain

Pitt MeadowsMaple RidgeMission
 Jeff Monds

Port MoodyWestwoodPort Coquitlam
 Rob Gillespie

SaanichGulf Islands
 Dale Leier

Surrey North
 Alex Joehl

Vancouver Centre
 John Clarke

Vancouver Kingsway
 Matt Kadioglu

Vancouver Quadra
 Norris Barens

Ontario

AjaxPickering
 Stephanie Wilson

Barrie
 Paolo Fabrizio

Guelph
 Phil Bender

Hamilton Centre
 Anthony Giles

KitchenerWaterloo
 Jason Cousineau

London North Centre
 Trevor Murray

MarkhamUnionville
 Allen Small

Ottawa South
 Jean-Serge Brisson, former Party leader

ScarboroughRouge River
 Alan Mercer

SimcoeGrey
 Caley McKibben

St. Paul's
 John Kittredge

TrinitySpadina
 Chester Brown

Saskatchewan

SaskatoonRosetownBiggar
 Kevin Stricker

References

 
Libertarian Party
2008